IMIT can mean:
 Institute of Medical Imaging Technology in the USA
 Institute of Musical Instrument Technology in the UK
 Institute of Medical Imaging Technology in the USA
 Institute for Management of Innovation and Technology, Göteborg, Sweden
 Institute for the Management of Information Technology in the UK
 Institute of Management and Information Technology, Orissa, India
 Izraelita Magyar Irodalmi Társulat, Judaic literary society, Hungary